Lennox Honychurch (born 27 December 1952) is Dominica's most noted historian and a politician. He is well known for writing 1975's The Dominica Story, the 1980s textbook series The Caribbean People, and the 1991 travel book Dominica: Isle of Adventure.  Also an artist and a curator, he was largely responsible for compiling the exhibit information for The Dominica Museum in Roseau. Honychurch is the grandson of writer and politician Elma Napier.

Biography
Born in Portsmouth, Dominica, Lennox Honychurch can trace his lineage in the Caribbean back to the 1790s.

Honychurch attended the St. Mary's Academy secondary school. After publishing several works on the history of Dominica, Honychurch was awarded the Chevening Scholarship to study at Oxford University, where he gained a PhD at St. Hugh's College. He read for his MPhil and PhD in Anthropology and Museology in 1995.

Honychurch's first job in the early 1970s was as a radio journalist, enabling him to reach out to locals about the island's history with a series of radio vignettes.

Honychurch serves as a board member and founder of the Museum Association of the Caribbean. He was instrumental in setting up Dominica's national museum in Roseau and has consulted at other museums and heritage sites throughout the Caribbean, including the Betty's Hope Plantation in Antigua, Fort Frederick in Grenada and Fort Charlotte in St Vincent. He is developing an ecology and heritage center in the history buildings around Fort Shirley, an 18th-century garrison in Cabrits National Park. This work includes training tour guides and providing education on sustainable, responsible tourism for communities around heritage sites.

Political career
Honychurch served as a senator in the House of Assembly of Dominica from 1975 to 1979 as a member of the Dominica Freedom Party (DFP). When the DFP formed the government in 1980 he also served as Press Secretary to The Government of Dominica until 1981.

Work as historian
Honychurch's writing describes the history of Dominica and includes The Dominica Story, first published in 1975, Dominica: Isle of Adventure, published in 1991, a three-book series entitled The Caribbean People (1995), Dominica's Cabrits and Prince Rupert's Bay (2013), and In the Forests of Freedom: The Fighting Maroons of Dominica (2017). 

In addition to his books, Honychurch has published several academic articles and organized the first international conference on Dominican writer Jean Rhys in 2004.

Honychurch is an expert in the First Peoples of the Caribbean and has collected archival material related to Amerindian-African contact. His graduate theses focused on the contact and culture exchange which took place between the indigenous Kalinago people of the Lesser Antilles and the people who arrived from Europe and Africa.

Work as artist 
Honychurch is a poet and painter. His murals adorn churches throughout Dominica, the main post office in Roseau, and the national museum. He is also a Carnival artist.

Awards
On 9 April 2011, Honychurch was awarded the Anthony N. Sabga Caribbean Awards for Excellence, in the category of Arts and Letters.

In 2012, he was awarded an honorary doctorate by the University of the West Indies and is an Honorary Research Fellow at the university.

He is a recipient of the Golden Drum Award for preservation of Dominica's cultural heritage as well as the Dominica Sisserou Medal of Honour for his contribution to historical and archaeological research.

Selected writings
 The Dominica Story (1975)
 Dominica: Isle of Adventure (1991)Caribbean Camera: A Journey Through the Islands (1992)
 The Caribbean People (three-book series; 1995)
 Dominica's Cabrits and Prince Rupert's Bay (2013)In the Forests of Freedom: The Fighting Maroons of Dominica (2017)

References

External links
Official site
 Raymond Ramcharitar, "Lennox Honychurch: Icon of the island", Caribbean Beat, Issue 113, November/December 2011.
 Lisa Paravisini, "Dominica Times profiles Lennox Honychurch as he wins Sabga Award", Repeating Islands'', 20 April 2011.

Dominica male writers
Dominica historians
Members of the House of Assembly of Dominica
1952 births
Living people
Dominica Freedom Party politicians
People from Saint John Parish, Dominica
Alumni of St Hugh's College, Oxford
Historians of the Caribbean